The New Jersey Division of Parks and Forestry manages a public park system which consists of over 50 protected areas designated as state parks, state forests, recreation areas, and other properties within the state of New Jersey in the United States. The agency also owns and manages 38 historical sites and buildings throughout the state (some located within the boundaries of state parkland) and also owns five public marinas and four public golf courses. These properties are administered by the Division's State Park Service, founded in 1923. New Jersey's state park system includes properties as small as the  Barnegat Lighthouse State Park and as large as the  Wharton State Forest. The state park system comprises —roughly 7.7% of New Jersey's land area—and serves over 17.8 million annual visitors.

History of the New Jersey state park system

Forests and the Forest Park Reservation Commission

At the beginning of the twentieth century, New Jersey did not have much of a lumber or forestry industry. The value of its trees was insignificant and undermined by destruction by uncontrolled forest fires, and after decades of clear-cutting forests to fuel iron forges, furnaces, and other industrial operations. In 1896, the state geologist recommended the acquisition of land for parks in order to protect water supplies and to provide natural recreation to the state's increasing urban populations. After several years of reports and advocacy of geologists and naturalists (including, notably, U.S. forester Gifford Pinchot), New Jersey governor Edward C. Stokes established the Forest Park Reservation Commission in 1905 to protect forest land and create a system of park reserves within the state. At the commission's meeting on September 12, 1905, the commissioners adopted the Salem Oak (of Salem, New Jersey) as a symbol of New Jersey's parks. The commissioners acquired two tracts in southern New Jersey, near Mays Landing and along the Bass River, as the first state forest reserves. The Mays Landing tract was sold in 1916 after opposition from local officials and landowners made acquisition and expansion on adjacent lands impossible. The Bass River tract became the core of Bass River State Forest. In 1907, the commissioners would also acquire  on Kittatinny Mountain near Culver's Gap, supplemented by a gift from Governor Stokes, which would become the core of Stokes State Forest. The reservations, which by 1912 comprised  became sites for studying forests, reforestation projects, and scientific forestry. With the acquisition of a tract that included Swartswood Lake in Stillwater Township, the commission began developing parks for the purposes of recreation by providing boating, fishing, camping, and picnicking. In the Commission's 1915 Annual Report, they stated "It is intended to make Swartswood a public playground. Boat liveries and picnic shelters to be maintained under proper control will make it available to a large number of people". The Forest Park Reservation Commission was consolidated with other agencies into the Department and Board of Conservation and Development on April 8, 1915.

State Park Service

In 1923, the legislature authorized the creation of the State Park Service to administer the state parks and forests. New Jersey began to redirect its efforts from the development of these and other properties for recreational purposes instead of protecting or promoting the commercial potential of forested land. The state legislature established a commission to create a historic park along the Delaware River above Trenton, at the location where George Washington and Continental Army crossed the river on December 25, 1776 before the surprise attack on Hessian troops at the Battle of Trenton and the Battle of Princeton (January 3, 1777). The initial plans were defeated by a public referendum, but there was increased desire to complete these plans to establish a Washington Crossing Memorial Park in time for the 150th anniversary of American independence in 1926. The park was officially dedicated and opened to the public on June 4, 1927. In the wake of World War I, state forester Alfred Gaskill proposed a new public park along Kittatinny Mountain, "as the State’s memorial to its sons who had made the supreme sacrifice in the Great War". A few years later, Colonel Anthony R. Kuser donated his mountaintop estate at High Point (the state's highest elevation) to the state for a public park with an additional gift of $500,000 to erect a granite-clad obelisk to honor veterans. Construction of the monument began in 1928 and was completed in 1930.

According to the New Jersey Conservation Foundation, the New Jersey Division of Parks and Forestry administers and manages  in its state parks, forests, and other areas. These areas, during the state's 2006 fiscal year (from July 1, 2005 to June 30, 2006) recorded 17,843,541 visitors.

Planning future parks
In 2006, the Division of Parks and Forestry began planning and preliminary work two new state parks: Great Falls State Park in Paterson, and Capital State Park in Trenton. The state's only other urban park is Liberty State Park in Jersey City. According to the master plan prepared by Philadelphia-based planning and urban design firm Wallace Roberts & Todd, Capital State Park would incorporate areas around the state's capitol complex in Trenton and the city's Delaware River and Assunpink Creek waterfronts to provide "a long-term strategy to revitalize Trenton by reestablishing connections to the downtown and reclaiming its riverfront." Great Falls subsequently became Paterson Great Falls National Historical Park.

In 2009, the state also purchased  in Jefferson Township the former site of the Mount Paul monastery and seminary belonging to Paulist Fathers (from 1924–2009). The tract, which will be developed into a state park, is located in the state's Highlands region on the eastern side of Sparta Mountain and featuring mountain streams that flow into the Russia Brook (a tributary of the Rockaway River).

In 2021, Governor Phil Murphy approved the state purchase of part of a defunct line from the Norfolk Southern Railway for the purpose of converting it into a new state park meant for biking and walking, tentatively named the "Essex-Hudson Greenway". The park will run from Montclair to Jersey City. Largely facilitated by the Open Space Institute, the park will also be a crucial part of both the East Coast Greenway and the 9/11 Memorial Trail, which will connect Shanksville, The Pentagon, and One World Trade Center. It is also possible that the park could connect to the Hackensack RiverWalk and/or the Hudson River Waterfront Walkway depending upon where the park ends in Jersey City. The park will most likely also incorporate NJ Transit's "Innovation Challenge", which aims to add a new, creative transportation solution to The Meadowlands.

Recreation and facilities

The State Park Service asks its visitors to embrace the "Carry In, Carry Out" philosophy in order to "keep the parks clean and beautiful by carrying out the trash you carry in".

Fishing and hunting are permitted in several of the state parks and forest.

Golf courses
The State Park System also includes four golf courses that are open to the public. Each of the four courses include associated restaurant and banquet facilities and is operated under contract between a private management company and the New Jersey Division of Parks and Forestry. Centerton Golf Course, located in Pittsgrove Township in Salem County is located within Parvin State Park. Cream Ridge Golf Course is located in Cream Ridge in Monmouth County and was acquired by the state in 2006. Spring Meadow Golf Course in Farmingdale in Monmouth County was privately developed and operated beginning in the 1920s and acquired by the state five decades later.

 White Oaks Golf Course - Gloucester County 2951 Dutch Mill Road Newfield, NJ 08344

Several of these properties were acquired as part of open space preservation initiatives managed by the New Jersey Department of Environmental Protections Green Acres Program.

State Parks

State forests

Recreation areas

State marinas

State-owned historic sites
These are state-owned historical sites in New Jersey. These state-owned historical sites are open to the public year-round on Wednesdays through Sundays (10:00 a.m. to 12:00 p.m., 1:00 p.m. to 4 p.m.)

See also
 List of New Jersey wildlife management areas
 List of Registered Historic Places in New Jersey
 Palisades Interstate Park - a protected area overseen by both New York and New Jersey along the Hudson River.

References

External links

New Jersey State Parks-Official Site

 
New Jersey state parks
Tourism in New Jersey
State parks